MPG or mpg may refer to:

 .mpg, one of a number of file extensions for MPEG-1 or MPEG-2 audio and video compression
 MPG (gene), a human gene coding for N-methylpurine DNA glycosylase
 M.P.G., a 1969 album by Marvin Gaye
 Manual pulse generator, a device normally associated with numerically controlled machinery
 Mark-Paul Gosselaar, American actor
 Matías Pérez García (born 1984), Argentine footballer
  (Max Planck Society), a German non-profit research organization
 Media Planning Group, former name of Havas Media, a media division of Havas
 Miles per gallon, a measurement of fuel economy in automobiles, boats and other motorized vehicles
 Milford Proving Ground, one of several General Motors Proving Grounds
 Minutes per game in basketball
 Monopotassium glutamate, a flavor enhancer
 Motor Press Guild, a non-profit association for professionals within the motoring press
 Multiplayer game
 Multiplayer video game
 Multi-touch, physics and gestures, a type of computer touch screen
 Music Producers Guild, an association of music producers in the United Kingdom